The Central Mosque of Lisbon is the main mosque of Lisbon, Portugal, serving the capital city's Islamic community, the mosque is Europe's third largest mosque outside of Turkey. The building was designed by the architects António Maria Braga, winner of the 2019 Rafael Manzano Prize, and João Paulo Conceição; its external features includes four minaret and two domes. The mosque contains reception halls, a prayer hall and an auditorium. The Central Mosque has formed a council to provide financial and others services to  members of the local Muslim community.

History
Although permission to build the center was requested in 1966, it was not granted until 1978 after the 1973 oil crisis through which the Arab oil-producing nations gained increasing economic and political status. The structure was finally inaugurated in 1985.

See also
 Islam in Portugal

References

1985 establishments in Portugal
Mosques completed in 1985
Mosques in Portugal
Religious buildings and structures in Lisbon